Addai is a Syriac given name, equivalent to Thaddeus. It may refer to:

Addai I, also known as Thaddeus of Edessa (1st/2nd century AD), saint and evangelist of Edessa
Addai II Giwargis, patriarch of the Ancient Church of the East since 1970
Addai Scher (1867–1915), the Chaldean Catholic archbishop of Siirt

See also
Doctrine of Addai, book containing the purported teachings of Thaddeus of Edessa
Liturgy of Addai and Mari, East Syriac liturgy named after Thaddeus of Edessa